Christoph-Michael Zeisner (5 December 1943 – 12 July 2022) was a German sports shooter. He competed at the 1972 Summer Olympics and the 1976 Summer Olympics for West Germany.

References

External links
 

1943 births
2022 deaths
German male sport shooters
Olympic shooters of West Germany
Shooters at the 1972 Summer Olympics
Shooters at the 1976 Summer Olympics
People from Gütersloh
Sportspeople from Detmold (region)
20th-century German people